The Doctrine of Concomitance is a Eucharistic theological doctrine held by some Christians which describes the nature of Christ's presence in the bread and wine of the sacrament of Eucharist.

Doctrine
The doctrine states that since Christ is indivisible, no one part of Christ's substance can be divided.  Thus, Christ's body can not be separated from his blood which means that Christ's full presence is in each element fully.

Use
The Doctrine of Concomitance has been used to justify communion under one kind of species, saying that the Christ is fully present in each species alone.  Further application allows those who are allergic to gluten, are alcoholics, or otherwise wish to abstain from alcohol consumption to receive one species alone with the assurance of the fullness of the sacrament.  Historically, this application contributed to the 1415 ruling by the Council of Constance that the laity should be given only the bread at communion.

References 

Sacramental theology
Eucharist
Eucharist in the Catholic Church